Framingham Airport may refer to:

 Framingham Airport (1923–32), Framingham, Massachusetts
 Framingham Airport (1931–45), Framingham, Massachusetts